Gargi Shankar Mishra (1 January 1919, Nagpur, (CP & Berar)), an Indian politician, was a member of the 8th Lok Sabha, representing the Seoni (Lok Sabha constituency) of Madhya Pradesh. 

He was also elected as member of the 4th, 5th, 6th, and 7th Lok Sabha of Indian Parliament.

References

1948 births
India MPs 1967–1970
India MPs 1971–1977
India MPs 1977–1979
India MPs 1980–1984
India MPs 1984–1989
People from Seoni district
Lok Sabha members from Madhya Pradesh
People from Chhindwara district
Politicians from Nagpur
Living people